Mbolo is a residential district of the city of N'Djamena, the capital of Chad.

Populated places in Chad
N'Djamena